Contracted: Phase II is a 2015 American zombie-body horror independent film and the sequel to the 2013 film Contracted. The film was directed by Josh Forbes, based on a script written by Craig Walendziak.

Phase II features most of the actors and actresses from the original cast of the first film, and follows the character of Riley (Matt Mercer) as he tries to find the man behind the sexually transmitted disease during the first days of its viral outbreak in Los Angeles. The film had its world premiere on July 5, 2015 at the Neuchâtel International Fantastic Film Festival.

Plot
After the events in the previous film, Riley (Matt Mercer) has begun showing symptoms of the same sexually transmitted disease that caused Samantha (Najarra Townsend) to turn into a zombie such as vomiting and urinating a lot of blood including blood coming out of his nose, beginning to look very pale, having a bloodshot eye, and maggots growing out of him. Panicking, Riley decides that he needs to track down the person who first infected Samantha, BJ (Morgan Peter Brown), in the hopes of gaining a cure. Besides showing the same symptoms as Samantha, most of the people Riley loved the most were infected by his virus, especially his grandmother, Margie, Harper, and finally his pregnant sister, Brenda (at the credits scene).

BJ has his own agenda, he is more than willing to continue to spread the disease to other victims. He is immune to the virus and continues to spread it to other victims like Samantha and four other missing women whom he randomly selected in the street. After having sexual intercourse with them, he injects the pathogen virus into their bodies before sending them home. Eventually, he sends threatening tapes to the special agent and orchestrates the end of the world with a zombie apocalypse.

As Riley decides to cooperate with Detective Crystal Young (Marianna Palka), he succumbs to the disease and is killed by BJ, who was at the hospital where Harper died of a seizure while trying to detonate a bomb to create a massive apocalypse by releasing other victims hospitalized there. As Riley is fully transformed into a zombie, he attacks BJ before Detective Young shoots him in the head.

In the mid-credits scene, BJ is shown to be alive, but hospitalized, while a doctor with an Abaddon tattoo tells BJ, "Very soon, my friend, very soon".

Cast
 Matt Mercer as Riley McCormick
 Marianna Palka as Detective Crystal Young
 Morgan Peter Brown as BJ
 Anna Lore as Harper
 Laurel Vail as Brenda
 Peter Cilella as James
 John Ennis as Special Agent Dalton
 Najarra Townsend as Samantha Williams
 Richard Riehle as Deuge Gelman
 Suzanne Voss as Margie
 Charley Koontz as Zain
 Alice Macdonald as Alice Patrick (archive footage)
 Ruben Pla as Doctor
 Caroline Williams as Sam's Mom (archive footage)
 Joanna Sotomura as Debbie

Also appearing in the film are Aaron Moorhead and Justin Benson as police officers, Adam Robitel and the film's second assistant director, Nic Birdsall as SWAT officers, Whitney Moore as a hooker, Jeffrey Reddick as a teacher, Ryan Ridley as an injured man, Charity Daw as an assistant nurse, Josh Edmondson as a Bio Doctor, Zach Zorba Grashin as an assistant doctor, and Josh Fadem and Elisha Yaffe as mormons.

Production
In April 2014, director Eric England had completed a draft of the script, titled Contracted: Phase II. In December 2014, the sequel was officially announced following the first film's success on VOD. England was not able to return due to his commitments to Get the Girl. Josh Forbes was brought in to direct the film, working from a new script by Craig Walendziak.

Release
After debuting at the Neuchâtel International Fantastic Film Festival in July 2015, the film was released in selected theaters and on-demand on September 4, 2015 by IFC Midnight.

Reception
Critical reception for Phase II has been negative and the film holds a rating of 38% on Rotten Tomatoes, based on 13 reviews. Metacritic reports a score of 35 out of 100 based on 7 critic reviews, indicating "generally unfavorable reviews".

Variety criticized the film, stating "Despite a couple of brief closing-credit epilogues suggesting future narrative directions, "Contracted: Phase II" feels too hurriedly conceived to expand on the original's premise in more than perfunctory fashion." Rogerebert.com panned Phase II and compared it unfavorably to its predecessor, writing that "Pointless body horror sequel "Contracted: Phase II" doesn't develop its predecessor's concepts so much as it resolves all of the questions you never needed answered." In contrast The Hollywood Reporter and The New York Times were more positive, and the Times praised Forbe's direction and visual effects.

References

External links
 

2015 films
2015 horror films
2015 independent films
American independent films
American body horror films
American zombie films
Films about infectious diseases
Films about rape in the United States
Films about sexually transmitted diseases
Films about substance abuse
Films about viral outbreaks
Films set in Los Angeles
Films shot in Los Angeles
2010s English-language films
2010s American films